Varadaraja may refer to:

 Varadarāja, grammarian
 Sri Varadaraja (Lord Varadaraja), a form of Vishnu
 Varadharaja Perumal Temple (disambiguation), various temples in Tamil Nadu